1972 Olympics refers to both:

1972 Winter Olympics, which were held in Sapporo, Japan
1972 Summer Olympics, which were held in Munich, West Germany